FK Madžari Solidarnost Junior is a football club from Madžari neighborhood, Skopje, Republic of North Macedonia. They are currently competing in the Macedonian Third League (North Division).

History
Football club Madžari Solidarnost, was formed in 1992 by joining the two football clubs FK Madžari and FK Solidarnost.

FK Madžari was founded back in 1947 as a local neighborhood club. In the course of its existence it has changed the name many times after the original name was FK Hajduk Madžari. It has also several times changed the location of the football stadium. From the football field across from the Skopje milk factory, to the field by the former police station Gazi Baba and since 1970, at its current location the Boris Trajkovski Stadium. In 1978, for the first time a youth team was formed with Kiro Karadžoski as manager. Since its existence it has played mainly in the lower division and finally achieved success by playing in the Macedonian First League for two years during the 2003–04 and 2004–05 seasons.

Honours

 Macedonian Second League:
Runners-up (1): 2002–03

 Macedonian Football Cup:
Runners-up (1): 2004–05

References

External links
Club info at MacedonianFootball 
Football Federation of Macedonia 

Madzari
Association football clubs established in 1992
1992 establishments in the Republic of Macedonia